Before the Bat's Flight Is Done is a 1989 Hungarian drama film directed by Péter Tímár. It was entered into the 39th Berlin International Film Festival.

Cast
 Gábor Máté as László
 Róbert Csontos as Robi
 Erika Bodnár as Teréz
 Erzsi Máthé as Felszolgáló a büfében (as Máté Erzsi)
 Dezső Garas as Zenetanár
 Péter Andorai
 Oszkár Gáti as Nyomozó
 Györgyi Kari
 Nóra Winkler
 Anna Blazovics (as Blazsovics Anna)
 Miklós Galla
 György Kölgyesi (as Kölgyesy György)
 Renáta Szatler

References

External links

1989 films
1989 crime drama films
Hungarian drama films
1980s Hungarian-language films
Films set in Budapest
Films directed by Péter Tímár